Gass may refer to:

Music
 The Gass, a British rock band formed in 1965 later known simply as Gass

People
 Gass (surname), a list of people with the surname
 Bobby Gass, a pseudonym used by the musician Bobby Tench

Places
 Gass, Maharashtra, a village in Maharashtra, India
 Gass Forest Museum, a natural history museum in Coimbatore, Tamil Nadu, India
 Gass House, a historic home in Guilford Township, Pennsylvania, United States
 Gass Peak, a mountain in Nevada, United States
 Mount Gass, a mountain on the border of Alberta and British Columbia, Canada
 Gass Cemetery, a cemetery in Omaha, Arkansas, United States

See also
 Gas (disambiguation)